Agathon "Aat" de Roos (15 April 1919 in Bloemendaal, North Holland – 17 March 1992 in Perth, Australia) was a Dutch field hockey player who competed in the 1936 Summer Olympics.

He was a member of the Dutch field hockey team, which won the bronze medal. He played four matches as forward.

External links
 
profile

1919 births
1992 deaths
People from Bloemendaal
Dutch male field hockey players
Olympic field hockey players of the Netherlands
Field hockey players at the 1936 Summer Olympics
Olympic bronze medalists for the Netherlands
Olympic medalists in field hockey
Medalists at the 1936 Summer Olympics
Sportspeople from North Holland
20th-century Dutch people